H. (died after 1279) was an unidentified nobleman in the Kingdom of Hungary, who served as master of the horse in 1279. Besides that he was also ispán (comes) of Moson County.

A royal charter from August 1279 only preserved the first letter of his name. He might have been the same person as Herbord from the gens Osl, who held, among others, the office of master of the horse formerly in 1277.

References

Sources
  Zsoldos, Attila (2011). Magyarország világi archontológiája, 1000–1301 ("Secular Archontology of Hungary, 1000–1301"). História, MTA Történettudományi Intézete. Budapest. 

Medieval Hungarian nobility
13th-century Hungarian people
Unidentified people
Year of birth unknown
Year of death unknown
Masters of the horse (Kingdom of Hungary)